The Daegu subway fire occurred on February 18, 2003, when an arsonist set fire to a train; 192 people died and 151 others were injured at the Jungangno station of the Daegu Metropolitan Subway in Daegu, South Korea. The fire had spread across two trains within minutes. It remains the deadliest deliberate loss of life in a single incident in South Korean peacetime history, succeeding the previous record set by a 1982 mass shooting.

Arsonist
The arsonist, Kim Dae-han, was a 56-year-old unemployed former taxi driver who had suffered a stroke in November 2001 that left him partly paralyzed. Kim was dissatisfied with his medical treatment and had expressed sentiments of violence and depression; he later told police he wanted to kill himself, but to do so in a crowded place rather than alone. By most accounts, on the morning of February 18, he boarded train 1079 on Line 1 in the direction of Daegok Station, carrying a duffel bag that contained two green milk cartons filled with a flammable liquid, possibly paint thinner or gasoline.

Arson
As the train left Banwoldang station around 9:53 a.m., Kim began fumbling with the cartons and a cigarette lighter, alarming other passengers who tried to stop him. In the struggle, one of the cartons spilled and its liquid contents caught fire as the train pulled into Jungangno station in downtown Daegu. Kim, his back and legs on fire, managed to escape along with many passengers on train 1079, but within two minutes the fire had spread to all six cars. The fire spread quickly in the insulation between the layers of aluminum that form the shell of the cars, the vinyl and plastic materials in seat cushions and strap handles, and heavy plastic matting on the floors, producing thick smoke as it burned.

Errors compounding the disaster 

The operator of the train, Choi Jeong-hwan (aged 31), failed to notify subway officials immediately of the fire.

Smoke being visible on their closed-circuit television monitors, subway officials radioed the operator of train 1080, Choi Sang-yeol, advising him to proceed with caution because there was a fire in the station. Train 1080 entered Jungangno station and stopped alongside blazing train 1079 approximately four minutes later. The doors opened only briefly, then shut, apparently in an effort to keep out the toxic smoke that had filled the station. Shortly after train 1080's arrival, an automatic fire detector shut down the power supply to both trains, preventing train 1080 from leaving the station.

Transcripts show Choi Sang-yeol made three announcements advising passengers in train 1080 to remain seated while he attempted to reach superiors. Finally, he was advised "Quickly, run somewhere else. Go up... kill the engine and go." Choi then opened the doors and fled, but in doing so he removed the master key, which led to a shutdown of the onboard batteries that powered the train doors and effectively sealed passengers inside. Later investigation showed that 79 passengers remained trapped inside train 1080 and died there.

Inadequate emergency equipment also worsened the disaster. Daegu subway trains were not equipped with fire extinguishers, and the stations lacked sprinklers and emergency lighting. Many victims became disoriented in the dark, smoke-filled underground station and died of asphyxiation looking for exits. Emergency ventilation systems also proved inadequate. Over 1,300 fire and emergency personnel responded and the fire itself was extinguished around 1:38 p.m.; however, the toxicity of the smoke prevented them from entering the station for another three and a half hours.

Victims 
The intensity of the fire made it difficult to accurately assess the number of victims. Most were burned beyond recognition, many to the bone, and required DNA analysis to identify. A total of 192 people were confirmed to have perished. Of the bodies found, 185 were identifiable; six could not initially be identified, of which three were discovered using DNA; and one person's possessions were identified but their remains could not be located.

As the incident occurred late in the morning rush hour, most of the victims were students or young women who worked in the downtown district's department stores, which opened at 10:30 a.m. Many were able to contact loved ones on their mobile phones, and mobile phone operators released call connection and attempt records to help authorities determine who was in the station.

Aftermath 

The incident prompted outpourings of sympathy and anger from throughout South Korea and internationally.

Officials promised to install better safety equipment in subway stations, and added spray-on fire resistant chemicals to the interiors of the cars of the Daegu Metropolitan Subway. Six stations were taken out of service for refurbishment and restored in April 2003. The tragedy was considered by many a national embarrassment, provoking debate about whether South Korea had cut too many corners in safety during its rapid industrialization. Several metro trains throughout the country were subsequently refurbished to improve fire-resistant standards within a few years of the accident.

On August 7, the Daegu District Court convicted Choi Sang-yeol, operator of train 1080, and Choi Jeong-hwan, operator of train 1079, sentencing them to prison for five and four years respectively for criminal negligence. Kim Dae-han was convicted of arson and homicide. Although prosecutors, with the support of victims' families, had sought the death penalty, the court instead sentenced him to life imprisonment on account of his remorse and mental instability. Kim died of a chronic illness in prison on August 31, 2004, in the city of Jinju, where he had been receiving medical treatment.

In December 2008, the Daegu Safety Theme Park opened. The goal was to educate the inhabitants of Daegu about safety.

Investigation and cover-up 

Choi Sang-yeol could not be located for 10 hours after the accident, and investigators later discovered he had made contact with officials from the subway corporation during that time. The master key from train 1080 was found in an office at the Ansim train depot. Omissions from transcripts of radio communications also heightened suspicion of an attempted cover-up.

See also

 1995 Baku Metro fire
 Chengdu bus fire
 King's Cross Fire
 List of transportation fires

References

Further reading

 iCivilEngineer Engineering Failure Watch: South Korean Subway Fire
 Soo-Jeong. "Subway horror: Errors revealed," Associated Press.
 Hwang Sun-yoon. "200 dead, missing in Daegu arson ," Joong-Ang Ilbo, February 19, 2003
 Byun Duk-kun. "Slow Response Causes More Death ," Hankook Ilbo February 18, 2003
 Dozens Dead, Hundreds Injured, Missing in South Korea Subway Fire, CNN Transcript, February 18, 2003
 Anger mounts over Korean fire, BBC News, February 20, 2003
 Kirk, Don. "Effort to Fix Responsibility for Deadly Korean Subway Fire," The New York Times, February 21, 2003
"Fire Alarm Ignored and Not Immediately Informed," Dong-A Ilbo, February 23, 2003
 Christensen, Geir. Letter to the Editor: "The Daegu Subway Fire," February 25, 2003
 "Death Toll in Daegu Is Likely to Reach 200," Dong-A Ilbo, February 26, 2003
 "Subway official told driver of train to leave passengers ," Joong-Ang Ilbo, February 26, 2003
 Choi Jie-ho. "Safety first -- and 2d, 3d, 4th . . . ," Joong-Ang Ilbo, April 8, 2003
 "Arsonist to serve life in Daegu subway fire , Joong-Ang Ilbo, August 7, 2003
 Daegu Subway Fire photo slideshow

2003 disasters in South Korea
Railway accidents and incidents in South Korea
Daegu Metro
History of Daegu
Train and rapid transit fires
Arson in South Korea
Railway accidents in 2003
2003 fires in Asia
2003 crimes in South Korea
Murder–suicides in South Korea
Mass murder in 2003
Mass murder in Asia
February 2003 events in South Korea
2003 murders in South Korea
Mass murder in South Korea